Abrotanella trichoachaenia is a member of the daisy family and is found in southern Chile to Argentina (Neuquén, Rio Negro).

References

trichoachaenia
Taxa named by Ángel Lulio Cabrera